Akutagawa (written: 芥川) is a Japanese surname. Notable people with the surname include:

, Japanese poet and writer
, Japanese composer and conductor, son of Akutagawa Ryunosuke
, Japanese painter
 David Akutagawa (1937–2008), Japanese-Canadian martial artist

See also
Akutagawa Prize, a literary award
Akutagawa (crater)

Japanese-language surnames